Fish Rising is the debut solo album by English guitarist Steve Hillage, recorded and released in 1975.

The album was recorded just prior to Hillage's departure from the band Gong, and many of the players on this album are from that band: Bassist Mike Howlett, drummer Pierre Moerlen, keyboardist Tim Blake and saxophonist Didier Malherbe.

In 2007, Virgin issued a re-mastered version with two bonus tracks. "Pentagrammaspin" had originally appeared on the Virgin V sampler album in 1975, and the "power trio" backing version of "Aftaglid" consisted of Hillage, Howlett and Moerlen.

Track listing
All music composed and arranged by Steve Hillage, lyrics by Hillage and Miquette Giraudy; Fish co-arranged by Dave Stewart

Side 1
"Solar Musick Suite" – 16:55 
"Sun Song (I Love its Holy Mystery)" – 6:15
"Canterbury Sunrise" – 3:25 
"Hiram Afterglid Meets the Dervish" – 4:05 
"Sun Song (reprise)" – 3:10 
"Fish" – 1:23 
"Meditation of the Snake" – 3:10

Side 2
"The Salmon Song" – 8:45 
"Salmon Pool" – 1:17 
"Solomon's Atlantis Salmon" – 2:08 
"Swimming with the Salmon" – 1:37 
"King of the Fishes" – 3:43 
"Aftaglid" – 14:46 
"Sun Moon Surfing" – 1:36 
"The Great Wave and the Boat of Hermes" – 1:51 
"The Silver Ladder" – 0:40 
"Astral Meadows" – 2:01 
"The Lafta Yoga Song" – 2:42 
"Glidding" – 2:23 
"The Golden Vibe"/"Outglid" – 3:33

Virgin 2007 re-master bonus tracks
"Pentagrammaspin" (2006 remix) – 7:46
"Aftaglid" (Original "Power Trio" backing track) – 13:00

Personnel 
Steve Hillage (listed as Steve Hillfish) – lead vocals, electric guitar, cover concept 
Miquette Giraudy (listed as Bambaloni Yoni) – background vocals, keyboards, synthesizers 
Mike Howlett – bass 
Pierre Moerlen – drums, marimba, darbuka 
Tim Blake (listed as Moonweed) – synthesizers, tamboura 
Didier Malherbe (listed as Bloomdido Glid de Breeze) – saxophone, Indian flute 
Lindsay Cooper – bassoon 
Dave Stewart – organ, piano

External links
Official Planet Gong website: lyrics, tabulated music

References

Steve Hillage albums
1975 debut albums
Space rock albums
Virgin Records albums